Yves Romeo Canlas Flores (born November 26, 1994) is a Filipino actor and model born in Angeles City, but grew up in Tarlac City. On April 8, 2012, he joined Pinoy Big Brother: Teen Edition 4 as a housemate. Flores is currently managed by and under contract to Star Magic, ABS-CBN's home based talent agency.

Personal life
Flores was raised in the city of Tarlac. He grew up as performer and at the age of 18, he joined the Pinoy Big Brother: Teen Edition 4. Flores was evicted from the house on Day 76.

Career
Yves signed a contract in Star Magic bottom of the winners Myrtle Sarrosa and Karen Reyes. Flores had a lot of projects in ABS-CBN primetime bida. In Forevermore, he stars as Andrew "Drew" Fontanilla. Yves is one of the members of Kapamilya Cuties.

Filmography

Television

Films

References

External links
 https://web.archive.org/web/20121215062251/http://pbb.abs-cbn.com/

1994 births
Living people
Pinoy Big Brother contestants
People from Angeles City
People from Tarlac City
Male actors from Tarlac
Star Magic